Tuareg – Il guerriero del deserto (internationally released as Tuareg – The Desert Warrior and Desert Warrior) is a 1984 Spanish-Italian adventure-action film directed by Enzo G. Castellari.

The film is based on a novel with the same name written by Alberto Vázquez-Figueroa. It represents the first film released by home video distribution company Mirisch.

Cast 
 Mark Harmon: Gacel Sayah 
 Luis Prendes: Abdul El Kabir
 Ritza Brown: Gacel's Wife 
 Aldo Sambrell: Sgt. Malick 
 Paolo Malco: Captain Razman 
 Antonio Sabàto: The Captain
 Giovanni Cianfriglia: Mubarak

References

External links

1984 films
1980s action adventure films
Spanish action adventure films
Films directed by Enzo G. Castellari
Films scored by Riz Ortolani
Films based on Spanish novels
Films set in deserts
Films set in Africa
Italian action adventure films
Films shot in Almería
1980s Italian films
1980s Spanish films